Lesley Tashlin (born 27 May 1969) is a Canadian sprinter. She competed in the women's 4 × 100 metres relay at the 1996 Summer Olympics.

References

External links
 

1969 births
Living people
Athletes (track and field) at the 1996 Summer Olympics
Canadian female sprinters
Canadian female hurdlers
Olympic track and field athletes of Canada
Athletes (track and field) at the 1995 Pan American Games
Athletes (track and field) at the 1999 Pan American Games
Pan American Games track and field athletes for Canada
Athletes (track and field) at the 1994 Commonwealth Games
Athletes (track and field) at the 1998 Commonwealth Games
Commonwealth Games competitors for Canada
Black Canadian track and field athletes
Black Canadian sportswomen
Athletes from Toronto